Krotz Springs is a town in St. Landry Parish, Louisiana, United States, on the Atchafalaya River. The population was 1,198 at the 2010 census, down from 1,219 in 2000. It is part of the Opelousas–Eunice Micropolitan Statistical Area.

History
Around the turn of the 20th century, an Ohio native, Charles William Krotz, bought  of woodland around the Atchafalaya Basin and set up a sawmill to trim the trees hauled out of the basin. The tiny settlement that grew up around the mill was called Latania (fan palm), after the bayou of the same name and the types of palm plants found in the area.

Thinking he was sitting on an untapped pool of oil, Krotz attempted to drill the first oil well in St. Landry Parish in 1900, but he struck water instead of oil, the result becoming known as Krotz’s spring. The spring was used to supply water for the developing sawmill town, and Krotz even bottled the water, selling it throughout the country.

In 1909, a post office was established in the town, and the obvious choice of a name was Krotz Springs.

The Krotz Springs Bridge spanning the Atchafalaya River opened in 1928 and carried railroad and automobile traffic. It was superseded by other bridges at the same location in 1934, 1973, and 1988.

Mayors
Robert A. Moran, a Democrat served as mayor from 1986 until his death in May 1987. On November 21, 1987, James Rasie Nall defeated Ina Moran (D) in a runoff election for mayor. Four years later, on October 6, 1990, Gary Soileau (D) defeated Larry Martinez, Sr. (D), in a landslide victory with 86 percent of the ballots cast. Soileau would remain mayor until he retired in 2010, when he was succeeded by current Mayor Carroll Snyder, another Krotz Springs Democrat.

List of most Krotz Springs Mayors since 1917:

Geography
Krotz Springs is located at  (30.537565, -91.754926).

Demographics

2020 census

As of the 2020 United States census, there were 904 people, 373 households, and 242 families residing in the town.

2010 census
As of the 2010 United States Census, there were 1,198 people living in the town. The racial makeup of the town was 97.2% White, 0.2% Black, 0.3% Native American, 0.4% Asian and 0.3% from two or more races. 1.5% were Hispanic or Latino of any race.

2000 census
As of the census of 2000, there were 1,219 people, 490 households, and 339 families living in the town. The racial makeup of the town was 99.10% White, 0.25% African American, 0.08% Native American, 0.08% from other races, and 0.49% from two or more races. Hispanic or Latino of any race were 0.74% of the population.

There were 490 households, out of which 34.9% had children under the age of 18 living with them, 52.4% were married couples living together, 11.8% had a female householder with no husband present, and 30.8% were non-families. 26.9% of all households were made up of individuals, and 12.9% had someone living alone who was 65 years of age or older. The average household size was 2.49 and the average family size was 2.99.

In the town, the population was spread out, with 26.9% under the age of 18, 11.4% from 18 to 24, 28.0% from 25 to 44, 20.2% from 45 to 64, and 13.5% who were 65 years of age or older. The median age was 33 years. For every 100 females, there were 95.4 males. For every 100 females age 18 and over, there were 87.2 males.

The median income for a household in the town was $26,823, and the median income for a family was $31,842. Males had a median income of $29,167 versus $21,875 for females. The per capita income for the town was $13,914. About 17.5% of families and 22.5% of the population were below the poverty line, including 25.6% of those under age 18 and 18.3% of those age 65 or over.

As of 2010, 77.39% of the population identified themselves as belonging to a faith community; of these 86.5% were Catholic, 9.4% were Southern Baptist and 2.4% were Churches of Christ.

According to the American Community Survey of 2010-2014, 82.2% of residents identify as having either French or French Canadian ancestry.

Film history
 1966: The prison camp scenes in Nevada Smith, starring Steve McQueen, were filmed just west of Krotz Springs in the 2 O'Clock Bayou area.
 1969: The final scene of Easy Rider, starring Peter Fonda and Dennis Hopper, was filmed a few miles north of there, in which the two main characters are shot by two local residents, David C. Billodeau and Johnny David, on Louisiana Highway 105.
 1998: In the film Out of Sight, starring George Clooney and Jennifer Lopez, two of the main characters lose control of their vehicle coming down the Atchafalaya River Bridge on U.S. Route 190 Westbound.

References

Towns in Louisiana
Towns in St. Landry Parish, Louisiana
Populated places established in 1909
1909 establishments in Louisiana